HMS Hermes was the Dutch cutter Mercuur, that the Amsterdam Admiralty purchased in 1781 or 1782. (Mercuur was a brig when captured.)  captured her off the Texel on 12 May 1796 after a chase during which Mercuur threw all but two of her guns overboard.

The British Royal Navy commissioned her in July 1796 under Commander William Mulso, for the North Sea.

Hermes disappeared during a gale on 31 January 1797. She was presumed to have foundered with all hands.

See also
List of people who disappeared mysteriously at sea

Notes

Citations

References
 
 
 

1781 ships
1790s missing person cases
Brig-sloops of the Royal Navy
Captured ships
Missing ships
People lost at sea
Ships built in the Netherlands
Warships lost with all hands